Cristidiscoidea or Nucleariae is a proposed basal holomycota clade in which Fonticula and Nucleariida emerged, as sister of the fungi. Since it is close to the divergence between the main lineages of fungi and animals, the study of Cristidiscoidea can provide crucial information on the divergent lifestyles of these groups and the evolution of opisthokonts and slime mold multicellularity. The holomycota tree is following Tedersoo et al.

Classification 

 Class Cristidiscoidea Cavalier-Smith 1998
 Order Fonticulida Cavalier-Smith 1993
 Family Fonticulidae Worley, Raper & Hohl 1979
 Genus Fonticula Worley, Raper & Hohl 1979
 Genus Parvularia López-Escardó 2017
 Species P. atlantis López-Escardó 2017
 Order Nucleariida Cavalier-Smith 1993
 Family Nucleariidae Cann & Page 1979
 Genus Nuclearia Cienkowski 1865

References

Opisthokont classes
Holomycota